BIOMAN is a Greek machine manufacturer, based in Koropi, near Athens. It was founded in 1967 by two mechanical engineers and has focused on design and construction of a wide variety of lifting devices/material handling equipment (hydraulic and electric, platforms, lifts, forklifts, dumpers etc.). Its early products included the Tiger family of vehicles, consisting of light and heavy dumpers and forklifts (no longer produced).

See also
 List of automobile manufacturers
 List of car brands

External links 
L.S. Skartsis, "Greek Vehicle & Machine Manufacturers 1800 to present: A Pictorial History", Marathon (2012)  (eBook)
http://www.bioman.gr

Construction equipment manufacturers of Greece
Greek brands